"Daisy" is Bonnie Pink's twelfth single. The single was released under the East West Japan label on October 16, 1999.

Track listing
Shortcut
Daisy
Not Ready
Toughness
Hang Glider

Oricon Sales Chart

1999 singles
Bonnie Pink songs
1999 songs
East West Records singles
Song articles with missing songwriters